Scott Patrick Fitterer (born November 4, 1973) is an American football executive who is the general manager of the Carolina Panthers of the National Football League (NFL). Fitterer began his executive career as a part-time scout with the New York Giants in 1998, and served the Seattle Seahawks in various executive roles throughout the 2000s and 2010s.

Early years

A Seattle, Washington native, Fitterer is a former two-sport player in college. He played both football and baseball at UCLA and baseball at LSU. Fitterer spent three years as a pitcher in the Toronto Blue Jays organization before shoulder problems ended his baseball career.

Executive career

New York Giants
In 1998, Fitterer began his executive career in the NFL with the New York Giants as a part-time area scout.

Seattle Seahawks
In 2001, Fitterer was hired by the Seattle Seahawks as an area scout. In 2011, he was promoted to director of college scouting. In 2016, Fitterer was promoted to co-director of player personnel. In 2020, he was promoted again vice president of football operations.

Carolina Panthers
On January 14, 2021, Fitterer was named the general manager of the Carolina Panthers.

Personal life
Fitterer is married to his wife, Cherish, and they have two children, a daughter Ella and a son Cole.  He has a degree in history from UCLA.

References

External links
Carolina Panthers bio

Living people
1973 births
New York Giants scouts
Seattle Seahawks scouts
Seattle Seahawks executives
Carolina Panthers executives
National Football League general managers
UCLA Bruins football players
UCLA Bruins baseball players
LSU Tigers baseball players
Baseball pitchers
American football quarterbacks
St. Catharines Blue Jays players
Dunedin Blue Jays players
Hagerstown Suns players
Players of American football from Seattle